George Bowman may refer to:

George Bowman (Australian politician) (1795–1878), pastoralist and politician in the colony of New South Wales
George Bowman (footballer) (1872–?), Scottish footballer
George Bowman (pioneer) (1699–1768), American pioneer, landowner and Indian fighter
George Bowman (Zen master), Zen Buddhist monk and psychotherapist
George Bowman (baseball) (1883–?), American baseball player
George A. Bowman (1890–1957), Wisconsin State Assemblyman
George S. Bowman Jr. (1911–2005), United States Marine Corps aviator
George Bowman, 2nd Baronet (1923–1990) of the Bowman baronets of the United Kingdom

See also
Bowman (disambiguation)